Academic Hospital Paramaribo (Dutch: Academisch Ziekenhuis Paramaribo or AZP) is a hospital in Paramaribo, Suriname. With 465 beds, it is the largest hospital in Suriname.

History 
The hospital was opened on 9 March 1966 as Centraal Ziekenhuis (Central Hospital), but changed its name in 1969 to Academic Hospital when the medical faculty of the Anton de Kom University of Suriname was founded.

See also 
's Lands Hospitaal, a general hospital in Paramaribo;
Sint Vincentius Hospital, a Catholic hospital in Paramaribo;
Diakonessenhuis, a Protestant hospital in Paramaribo.
Mungra Medisch Centrum, medical centre district Nickerie.

Hospitals in Suriname